Stoß may refer to:

 Stoß (card game), a German gambling card game usually known as Tempeln
 Stoß (unit), a unit of cattle stock density

See also
 Stoss (disambiguation)